Akulivik (2021 population 642) is an Inuit village in Nunavik, in northern Quebec, Canada. It is located on a peninsula that juts southwesterly into Hudson Bay across from Smith Island, Nunavut (Qikirtajuaq). Akulivik lies 1,850 km north of Montreal.

Akulivik, meaning "central prong of a kakivak" in the Nunavik dialect of Inuktitut, takes its name from the surrounding geography. Located on a peninsula between two bays, the area evokes the shape of a kakivak, a traditional, trident-shaped spear used for fishing.

Telephone and internet services are delivered by satellite. There is no hospital, but a clinic staffed by nurses provides non-critical care; otherwise air ambulances are available. Policing is done by the Kativik Regional Police Force.

History
Akulivik was incorporated as a community in 1976. The Inuit have lived in the area for thousands of years. In 1610, the explorer Henry Hudson passed by the island of Qikirtajuaq near present-day Akulivik.

In 1922, the Hudson's Bay Company established a trading post on the site of today's settlement. The outpost was moved to the island of Qikirtajuaq in 1926. Between 1922 and 1955, the area where Akulivik is located today was the summer camp of Inuit who congregated around the trading post. In 1952, the post was closed, forcing the families to move to Puvirnituq, 100 km to the south.

In 1973, one family moved back to the area. The following year, many others followed and, together, they built the village of Akulivik.

On June 11, 2017, a resident named Illutak Anautak broke into three homes and stabbed five people, killing three and critically injuring two, among them a 10-year-old child. Anautak was shot and killed by police when attempting to break into a fourth home. His motives were unclear.

Demographics 

Education
The Kativik School Board operates the Tukisiniarvik School.

The Tukisiniarvik School has 167 students in classes from Kindergarten to Secondary V (Grade 11). Inuktitut remains the dominant language of the community.  As in all the communities of Nunavik, Inuktitut is also the language of instruction at school until grade 3, at which point students choose between English or French as the language of instruction, and continue to study Inuktitut language and Inuit culture as separate subjects.

Transportation
Inaccessible by road, Akulivik is served by the small Akulivik Airport - AKV.

Ice starts to form in late September and stays until late July, when the Bay becomes navigable. Large items are delivered by ship, including in building supplies, snowmobiles and gasoline, as well as a year's supply of diesel fuel for the town generator. Thrice-weekly air service brings cargo including food and services to Akulivik.

References

Further reading

 Kaminski, Gregory. Operations Report of the Research on Lake Isurqutuuq Near Akulivik, Eastern Hudson Bay, Northern Quebec, 1994. [Quebec]: Kuujjuaq Research Centre, 1994.
 Makivik Corporation, and Administration régionale de Kativik (Quebec). The Life History and Subsistence Use of Arctic Charr in Northern Quebec, with Case Studies in Payne Bay, Akulivik, & George River. [Kuujjuaq, Quebec]: Kativik Regional Government, Hunter Support Program, 1981.
 The Way We Live Sculptures by Levi Alasuak from Akulivik. Mississauga, Ont: Tuttavik, 1988.

External links

Website of the village of Akulivik
Website of the Kativik Regional Police Force
Demographic and other information from the Department of Indian and Northern Affairs Canada
Akulivik, Quebec's population info

Inuit communities in Quebec
Populated places on Hudson Bay
Road-inaccessible communities of Quebec